Marguerite Philippe (Breton Marc'harid Fulup 12 August 1837 Pluzunet -  14 January 1909), was a beggar from the province of Trégor in Brittany, and a storyteller in the Breton language.

Life 
She was illiterate, but endowed with a prodigious memory; she knew about 150 songs ("gwerz") and a large quantity of tales and stories of all kinds, which she had begun to learn from her parents.

She was handicapped, and she could not work with her hands. She also earned her living by attending pilgrimages to Léon and Cornouaille, and by making pilgrimages by proxy, notably to Sainte-Anne-d'Auray or the Tro Breizh, for those who paid her.

On 6 November 1875, she married René Salaün.

Many of the songs and tales they knew were collected by François-Marie Luzel, and published in his works.

Legacy 
Her tomb, in the cemetery of Pluzunet, was sculpted by Yves Hernot. In 1898, Ange M. Mosher, an American patron of Breton culture, commissioned a monument to her memory, in Pluzunet with Anatole Le Braz and other Breton regionalists.

A street in Quimper, and a street in Lannion, is named for her.  described Marguerite Philippe in his novel L'Œuvre de chair.

See also 
Trégorrois Breton dialect

References 

1837 births
1909 deaths
Breton-speaking people
18th-century Breton people
French storytellers